Adoxophyes tetraphracta is a species of moth of the family Tortricidae. It is found in New Guinea and Vietnam.

The wingspan is 13–15 mm. The forewings are whitish yellow. The median fascia extends from the costal fold towards the tornal spot. The subterminal fascia is connected with the costal blotch.

The larvae feed on Theobroma cacao.

References

Moths described in 1938
Adoxophyes
Moths of Asia